Greg DeVries (born 1969/1970) is an American politician who served as a member of the Montana House of Representatives from 2019 to 2021.

References 

21st-century American politicians
Place of birth missing (living people)
Living people
Republican Party members of the Montana House of Representatives
1960s births